Night of Joy is the fourth live album released by the Athens, GA based band Widespread Panic. The album was recorded during a show in 2003 at the House of Blues in South Carolina. It was released on March 23, 2004 and features the Dirty Dozen Brass Band.

The album reached a peak position of #157 on both the Billboard 200 chart and the Top Internet Albums chart.

Track listing
"Thought Sausage" (Widespread Panic) – 5:31
"Thin Air" (Widespread Panic) – 7:50
"Use Me" (Withers) – 8:27
"Bayou Lena" (Widespread Panic) – 6:41
"Old Neighborhood" (Widespread Panic) – 6:20
"Bust It Big" (Widespread Panic) – 9:05
"Arleen" (Riley) – 10:22
"I Wish" (Wonder) – 6:56
"Rebirtha" (Widespread Panic) – 17:15

Personnel
Widespread Panic
John Bell – guitar, vocals
John Hermann – keyboards, vocals
George McConnell – guitar, vocals
Todd Nance – drums, vocals
Domingo S. Ortiz – percussion
Dave Schools – bass

Guest Performers
Revert Andrews – trombone
Kevin Bruce Harris – sax (tenor)
Terence Higgins – percussion, drums
Roger Lewis – sax (baritone, soprano)
Julius McKee – sousaphone
Efrem Towns – trumpet, flugelhorn

Production
John Keane – producer, mixing
Billy Field – engineer
Ken Love – mastering
Brad Blettenberg – assistant
Flournoy Holmes – artwork, design, photography
Ellie MacKnight – package coordinator
Oade Brothers – assistant
Chris Rabold – assistant
Tom L. Smith – photography

References

External links
Widespread Panic website
Everyday Companion
[ All Music entry]

2004 live albums
Widespread Panic live albums
Albums produced by John Keane (record producer)